Sodom and Gomorrah: The Last Seven Days is a 1975 pornographic film directed and produced by the Mitchell brothers, set in biblical times. It is loosely based on the biblical Sodom and Gomorrah, with a subplot where extraterrestrial aliens observe Earth. The space captain of their ship has the physical appearance of a chimpanzee and speaks with a voice which imitates John Wayne. The picture had a budget of one million dollars, and the soundtrack was created by Mike Bloomfield and Barry Goldberg. Nevertheless, it was a huge flop at the box office.

Plot

Lot and his family move to Sodom, where king Bera rules. He hopes to start a life as a merchant, but is instead confronted with the strange laws of the city, which forbid vaginal intercourse. Meanwhile, the events are witnessed by an extraterrestrial spaceship which has a monkey for a captain.

Cast
 Priscilla Alden - Townsperson
 Tom Bowden - Townsperson
 Sean Brancato - King Bera
 Deborah Brast - Leah 1
 Jacquie Brodie - Milcah
 Tom Carlton - Townsperson

Sources

External links
 

American pornographic films
1975 films
1970s pornographic films
Films critical of religion
Films based on the Book of Genesis
Alien visitations in films
Israel in fiction
Religious satire films
Sodom and Gomorrah
Cultural depictions of John Wayne
1970s English-language films
1970s American films